Stylobates may refer to:
 Stylobates (cnidarian), a genus of cnidarians in the family Actiniidae
 Stylobates (fungus), a genus of funguses in the order Agaricales, family unassigned